Comanche County (county code CM) is a county located in the U.S. state of Kansas. As of the 2020 census, the county population was 1,689. Its county seat and most populous city is Coldwater. The county is named after the Comanche Native Americans.

Geography

Adjacent counties
 Kiowa County (north)
 Barber County (east)
 Woods County, Oklahoma (south)
 Harper County, Oklahoma (southwest)
 Clark County (west)

Demographics

 
As of the census of 2000, there were 1,967 people, 872 households, and 540 families residing in the county.  The population density was 2 people per square mile (1/km2).  There were 1,088 housing units at an average density of 1 per square mile (1/km2).  The racial makeup of the county was 97.97% White, 0.05% Black or African American, 0.25% Native American, 0.05% Asian, 0.20% Pacific Islander, 0.61% from other races, and 0.86% from two or more races. Hispanic or Latino of any race were 1.78% of the population.

There were 872 households, out of which 24.40% had children under the age of 18 living with them, 54.40% were married couples living together, 6.20% had a female householder with no husband present, and 38.00% were non-families. Of all households 35.90% were made up of individuals, and 21.20% had someone living alone who was 65 years of age or older.  The average household size was 2.18 and the average family size was 2.81.

In the county, the population was spread out, with 22.10% under the age of 18, 4.50% from 18 to 24, 21.00% from 25 to 44, 26.50% from 45 to 64, and 25.80% who were 65 years of age or older.  The median age was 47 years. For every 100 females there were 93.60 males.  For every 100 females age 18 and over, there were 87.50 males.

The median income for a household in the county was $29,415, and the median income for a family was $36,790. Males had a median income of $24,844 versus $18,221 for females. The per capita income for the county was $17,037.  About 8.50% of families and 10.20% of the population were below the poverty line, including 9.70% of those under age 18 and 7.70% of those age 65 or over.

Government

Presidential elections

Laws
The Kansas Constitution was amended in 1986 to allow the sale of alcoholic liquor by the individual drink with the approval of voters, either with or without a minimum of 30% of sales coming from food. Comanche County is one of 35 counties in the state that allows for the sale of liquor by the drink without the minimum food sales stipulation.

Education

Unified school districts
 Comanche County USD 300

Communities

Cities
 Coldwater
 Protection
 Wilmore

Unincorporated community
 Buttermilk

Townships
Comanche County is divided into four townships.  None of the cities within the county are considered "governmentally independent", and all figures for the townships include those of the cities.  In the following table, the population center is the largest city (or cities) included in that township's population total, if it is of a significant size.

See also

 Dry counties
 National Register of Historic Places listings in Comanche County, Kansas

References

Notes

Further reading

 Standard Atlas of Comanche County, Kansas; Geo. A. Ogle & Co; 42 pages; 1909.

External links

 County
 
 Comanche County - Directory of Public Officials
 Maps
 Comanche County Maps: Current, Historic, KDOT
 Kansas Highway Maps: Current, Historic, KDOT
 Kansas Railroad Maps: Current, 1996, 1915, KDOT and Kansas Historical Society

 
1867 establishments in Kansas
Kansas placenames of Native American origin
Kansas counties
Populated places established in 1867